Moreau Township is an inactive township in Moniteau County, in the U.S. state of Missouri.

Moreau Township was established in 1845, taking its name from the Moreau River.

References

Townships in Missouri
Townships in Moniteau County, Missouri
Jefferson City metropolitan area